Gangland is a television series that aired on the History Channel. Gangland explored the history of some of America's more notorious gangs. It premiered on November 1, 2007, with an episode about the Aryan Brotherhood. The theme song was performed by rapper Buckshot of the Boot Camp Clik.

Episodes

Series overview

Season 1 (2007–08)

Season 2 (2008)

Season 3 (2009)

Season 4 (2009)

Season 5 (2009)
"Ice Cold Killers" is not included on the DVD release.

Season 6 (2009–10)
Neither "Mile High Killers" nor "Public Enemy Number One" are included on the DVD release. There was no break between seasons 6 and 7, the list below is based on the DVD release which ends with "Hell House".

Season 7 (2010)

References

2007 American television series debuts
2010 American television series endings
History (American TV channel) original programming
Works about gangs